Restrepo is a surname and may refer to:

People
 Andrew Restrepo (born 1970), American soccer player
 Camilo Torres Restrepo (1929–1966), Colombian socialist, priest, academic and guerilla
 Carla Restrepo, Colombian biologist and academic
 Carlos Restrepo (disambiguation), multiple people
 Daniel Restrepo (born 2000), Colombian diver
 Diego Restrepo (born 1988), American soccer player
 Eduardo Restrepo Sáenz (1886–1955), Colombian lawyer, historian, diplomat and politician
 Eduardo Restrepo Victoria (born 1958), Colombian drug trafficker
 Fabio Ochoa Restrepo (1923–2002), Colombian drug trafficker
 Felipe Restrepo Pombo, Colombian journalist and writer
 Félix Restrepo Mejía (1887–1965), Colombian priest, writer, pedagogue, classical scholar and humanist
 Gustavo Restrepo (born 1982), Colombian race walker
 Gustavo Restrepo (footballer) (born 1969), Colombian footballer
 Griselda Blanco Restrepo (1943–2012), Colombian drug trafficker
 Hugo Restrepo (born 1950), Colombian film producer, cultural critic and writer
 Jhonatan Restrepo (born 1994), Colombian cyclist
 John Restrepo (born 1977), Colombian footballer
 Jonathan Restrepo (born 1994), Colombian footballer
 José Restrepo (wrestler) (born 1974), Colombian wrestler
 José Manuel Restrepo Abondano (born 1969), Colombian academic, economist, journalist and politician
 José Manuel Restrepo Vélez (1781–1863), Colombian botanist, politician and historian
 José Reynal-Restrepo (1977–2011) Colombian priest, anti-mining activist and murder victim
 Juan Camilo Restrepo Salazar (born 1946), Colombian politician and diplomat
 Juan David Restrepo (born 1979), Colombian actor and film director
 Juan Sebastián Restrepo (born 1986), American soldier and medic who was the subject of the documentary film Restrepo
 Juana Acosta Restrepo (born 1976), Colombian actress
 Julieth Restrepo (born 1986), Colombian model and actress
 Laura Restrepo (born 1950), Colombian writer
 Luis Carlos Restrepo (born 1954), Colombian psychiatrist, philosopher and diplomat
 L. Felipe Restrepo (born 1959), American judge and lawyer
 Marcela Restrepo (born 1995), Colombian footballer
 Marco Restrepo (born 1989), American musician, songwriter and producer
 Marcos Restrepo (born 1961), Ecuadorian painter
 Mateo Restrepo (born 1997), Canadian soccer player
 Nicanor Restrepo Giraldo (1871–1938), Colombian businessman and politician
 Nixon Restrepo (born 1993), Colombian footballer
 Pablo Restrepo (born 1960), Colombian swimmer
 Pedro Restrepo (1920–2012), Colombian artist, civil servant, art historian and writer
 Rocio Restrepo (born 1987), Colombian bowler
 Vanesa Restrepo (born 1987), Colombian actress and model
 Wálter Restrepo (born 1988), American soccer player
 Ximena Restrepo (born 1969), Colombian sprinter

Fictional characters
 Cataleya Restrepo, a character in the 2011 film Colombiana played by Amandla Stenberg
 Fabio Restrepo, Cataleya's father in Colombiana played by Jesse Borrego

Spanish-language surnames